Annely Akkermann (born 5 October 1972) is an Estonian politician who has been serving as Minister of Finance in the government of Prime Minister Kaja Kallas since 19 October 2022. 

She was born in Linaküla on the island of Kihnu in the west of Estonia.
In 1990 she finished high school in Pärnu, in 2009 her studies in Economics at the University of Tartu.

From 1990 to 1991 she worked at the Commercial Bank in Pärnu. Then she acted as member in different supervisory boards and management boards: PLC Kihnurand, Management Board 1991–2006; Open Kihnu Foundation, Management Board 1992–2009; PLC Port Artur, Supervisory Board 1996–2009; PLC Kihnu Veeteed, Management Board 2002–2005; PLC Triple Invest, Supervisory Board 1997–2009; Port Artur Grupp OÜ, Supervisory Board 2002–2009; Kihnu Cultural Space Foundation, Supervisory Board since 2003; Port Artur Haldus OÜ, Supervisory Board 2003–2009; PLC Kihnurand, Supervisory Board 2006–2009; Pärnu Tourism Foundation, Supervisory Board since 2007; non-profit organisation "Liivi Lahe Kalanduskogu", Management Board 2008–2009.

Her political commitment started with accession to "Pro Patria ja Res Publica Liit" (IRL). From 2005 to 2009 she was the mayor of Kihnu Municipality Government. Later from 2009 to 2011 she worked as assistant mayor of Pärnu City Government. In 2011 she was elected member of Riigikogu, Estonian parliament. She works in the Ecology Committee and in the Select Budgetary Committee. Furthermore, she is the chairwoman of IRL-Naiskogu (IREN), the women's association of IRL.

Annely Akkermann speaks Estonian and English. She is married and has three children.

References

1972 births
21st-century Estonian politicians
21st-century Estonian women politicians
Estonian Reform Party politicians
Living people
Female finance ministers
Members of the Riigikogu, 2011–2015
Members of the Riigikogu, 2019–2023
Members of the Riigikogu, 2023–2027
People from Kihnu Parish
University of Tartu alumni
Women members of the Riigikogu